The Renault DeZir is an electric concept car, with zero emissions, that was first officially presented at the 2010 Paris Motor Show. The car is a 2-seat coupe with butterfly doors and the interior is finished in red leather. The concept's butterfly doors open like a conventional butterfly door on the driver's side and a suicide butterfly door on the passenger's side. The car costs $2 million.

Performance 

Related cars

Renault Sport R.S. 01

The Renault Sport R.S. 01 is a race car manufactured by Renault and is based on the DeZir. The car originally raced in Renault's own one-make series, the Renault Sport Trophy, and later raced in the Group GT3 classification.

Unlike the DeZir, the R.S. 01 has a petrol engine.

Alpine A110-50

The Alpine A110-50 is a concept car manufactured by Renault, and although not based on it, has similarities to the DeZir. The car was built to commemorate 50 years of the original A110 from 1962. The Alpine was used as Renault’s first-ever rally car. After 1973, production stopped altogether, the A110-50 was built to again be used as a rally car and to celebrate the 50th anniversary of the Alpine.

Like the R.S. 01, the A110-50 does not use an electric motor, but a petrol engine. It uses a  variation of the Mégane's 3.5-liter Nissan VQ-based V6.

References

External links

DeZir
Cars introduced in 2010
Electric sports cars
Coupés